The Château de Font-Moreau (or Fontmoreau) is a ruined castle in the commune of Plou in the Cher département of France. The remains consist of the exterior fortifications, the keep and a tower. It is located in woods about 4km north east of the town. It is recorded from at least 1380.

See also
List of castles in France

References

Ruined castles in Centre-Val de Loire
Buildings and structures in Cher (department)